Shaneka Tarae Johnson (born July 29, 1983) is a Democratic member of the Maryland House of Delegates appointed in May 2019 to replace the late Michael E. Busch. In October 2019 House Speaker Adrienne A. Jones assigned Henson to serve on the appropriations committee led by Baltimore Democrat Del. Maggie McIntosh.

Henson was previously a member of the Annapolis City Council representing Ward 6 from December 4, 2017, to April 29, 2019. In June 2017 Henson was endorsed by the Maryland League of Conservation Voters followed by a coveted endorsement from the Sierra Club Maryland Chapter in October 2017.

Committee appointments
Henson's committee appointments have been Ways and Means Committee, 2023-; Joint Committee on Children, Youth, and Families, 2023-; Appropriations Committee, 2019-23. Henson moved from Appropriations to Ways and Means in 2023, swapping assignments with Del. Dana Jones when questions were raised about a potential conflict of interest involving Henson's legal work for a nonprofit which received state funding.

Legislation 
In 2020, Henson sponsored a bill that took effect October 1, 2020, that would allow incarcerated parents to have their child support order frozen while behind bars if they are serving a jail sentence of six months or more. Prior to the law's passing, the threshold was 18 months. Henson introduced a bill co-sponsored in the Maryland Senate by Democrat Sen. Sarah K. Elfreth that took effect October 1, 2020, to close a loophole in state law allowing the City of Annapolis to avoid the responsibility of inspecting and licensing public housing units like other rentals in the city.

In July 2020, Henson made a pitch to Maryland's congressional delegation for federal legislation to recognize racism as a public health trauma and to implement supports for her constituents and all Black Americans.

Career 
In 2020, Henson founded Johnson Legal Group, LLC, a law firm based in Annapolis, MD where she is Principal Legal Counsel. Henson previously worked as an attorney in the Maryland Office of Attorney General for Maryland Attorney General Doug Gansler from 2013 to 2014 and for Maryland Attorney General Brian Frosh from 2014 to 2019. Henson was previously an attorney for the YWCA of Annapolis and Anne Arundel County where she represented women and men fleeing domestic abuse.

Groups and Organizations 
Henson is a member of the Legislative Black Caucus of Maryland and Women's Caucus of Maryland. Henson is an alumni and supporter of Emerge Maryland, a statewide organization to recruit, train and empower Democrat women to run for office. Henson is a board member for Maryland Food Bank.

References

Living people
Democratic Party members of the Maryland House of Delegates
Coppin State University alumni
University of Baltimore School of Law alumni
1983 births
21st-century American politicians
21st-century American women politicians
Women state legislators in Maryland
African-American city council members in Maryland
Women city councillors in Maryland
Maryland city council members
Annapolis City Council members